7 P.M. or variants may refer to:

A time on the 12-hour clock
The 7PM Project, previous name of the Australian TV program The Project
"7:PM", a 2005 song by Yann Tiersen on the album Les Retrouvailles

Date and time disambiguation pages